Annexstad Peak is a partially ice-free peak,  high, on the west side of the crater rim of Mount Cumming, in the Executive Committee Range, Marie Byrd Land. 

It was mapped by the United States Geological Survey from surveys and from U.S. Navy trimetrogon photography, 1958–60, and named by the  Advisory Committee on Antarctic Names for John O. Annexstad, geomagnetician and station seismologist at Byrd Station, 1958, and later with the Meteorite Working Group, Johnson Space Center, Houston, Texas.

References
 

Mountains of Marie Byrd Land
Executive Committee Range